George Harrison and Eric Clapton played twelve concerts in Japan in December of 1991. This was the second solo tour of George Harrison's career, and ended up being his last. 
Recordings of performances from this tour were released on Harrison's 1992 album Live in Japan.

Overview
The tour featured mostly Harrison's performances as a lead artist with Clapton taking the lead role in the middle of the shows for four songs.

Set list

Average set list:

"I Want to Tell You"
"Old Brown Shoe"
"Taxman"
"Give Me Love (Give Me Peace on Earth)"
"If I Needed Someone"
"Something"
"Fish On The Sand" (played only on 1 and 2 December)
"Love Comes To Everyone" (played only on 1 December)
"What Is Life"
"Dark Horse"
"Piggies"
"Pretending" (Jerry Lynn Williams)
"Old Love" (Eric Clapton, Robert Cray)
"Badge" (Eric Clapton, George Harrison)
"Wonderful Tonight" (Eric Clapton)
"Got My Mind Set on You" (Rudy Clark)
"Cloud 9"
"Here Comes the Sun"
"My Sweet Lord"
"All Those Years Ago"
"Cheer Down" (George Harrison, Tom Petty)
"Devil's Radio"
"Isn't It a Pity"

Encore:
"While My Guitar Gently Weeps"
"Roll Over Beethoven"

Personnel
George Harrison – rhythm, lead and slide guitars, acoustic guitar, lead vocals
Eric Clapton – lead guitar, acoustic guitar, backing vocals, lead vocals on "Pretending", "Old Love", "Badge", and "Wonderful Tonight"
Andy Fairweather Low – guitar, backing vocals
Nathan East – bass, backing vocals
Chuck Leavell – piano, Hammond organ, keyboards, backing vocals
Greg Phillinganes – keyboards, backing vocals
Steve Ferrone – drums
Ray Cooper – percussion, drums
Katie Kissoon – background vocals
Tessa Niles – background vocals

Tour dates

References

External links
George Harrison Concert Setlists & Tour Dates - Setlist.fm

1991 concert tours
Co-headlining concert tours
Eric Clapton
George Harrison
1991 in Japanese music
Concert tours of Japan